Madis Kallas (born 22 April 1981) is an Estonian decathlete and politician, Minister of the Environment of Estonia. From 2017 to 2020 and again from 2021 to 2022 he was the mayor of Saaremaa Municipality.

Achievements

References

1981 births
Estonian decathletes
Estonian sportsperson-politicians
Living people
Mayors of Kuressaare
Members of the Riigikogu, 2023–2027
People from Kuressaare
Social Democratic Party (Estonia) politicians
Sportspeople from Kuressaare